Nadene Caldwell (born 24 January 1991) is a Northern Irish futsal player and an association footballer who plays as a midfielder for Women's Premiership club Glentoran and the Northern Ireland women's national team.

International goals

References

External links

1991 births
Living people
Women's association footballers from Northern Ireland
Women's association football midfielders
Northern Ireland women's international footballers
Women's futsal players
UEFA Women's Euro 2022 players